Karen Solie (born 1966) is a Canadian poet.

Born in Moose Jaw, Solie grew up on the family farm in southwest Saskatchewan. Over the years, she has worked as a farm hand, an espresso jerk, a groundskeeper, a newspaper reporter/photographer, an academic research assistant, and an English teacher. She currently resides in Toronto, Ontario.

Karen Solie's poetry, fiction and non-fiction have appeared in numerous North American journals, including Geist, The Fiddlehead, The Malahat Review, Event, Indiana Review, Arc Poetry Magazine, Other Voices, and The Capilano Review. She has also had her poetry published in the anthologies Breathing Fire (1995), Hammer and Tongs (1999), and Introductions: Poets Present Poets (2001). One of her short stories was featured in The Journey Prize Anthology 12 (2000). Solie's poem "Prayers for the Sick" won second place in Arc Magazine's 2008 Poem of the Year Contest.

Solie was one of the judges for the 2007 Griffin Poetry Prize, judged the 2012 Walrus Poetry Prize, and was a judge for the Poetry in Voice Canadian high school poetry recitation competition. In 2014, she was named as a trustee to the Griffin Trust for Excellence in Poetry.

Her collection The Road in Is Not the Same Road Out was published in 2015.

In 2015, she won the Latner Writers' Trust Poetry Prize.

Her newest poetry book, The Caiplie Caves, was published in 2019.

Bibliography 
Short Haul Engine (2001)  - winner of the 2002 Dorothy Livesay Poetry Prize, shortlisted for the 2002 Canadian Griffin Poetry Prize, the Gerald Lampert Award, and the ReLit Award
Modern and Normal (2005) - shortlisted for the 2006 Trillium Book Award for Poetry, longlisted for the 2006 ReLit Award
Pigeon (2009) - winner of the 2010 Canadian Griffin Poetry Prize, Pat Lowther Award and Trillium Book Award for Poetry
The Living Option (2013)
The Road In Is Not the Same Road Out (2015)
The Caiplie Caves (2019)
 A sharing economy, Granta #141: Special Canada, 2017, pp 114 – 115

References

External links 
 Conversation with Karen Solie by The Poetry Extension

1966 births
Living people
Canadian women poets
People from Moose Jaw
Writers from Saskatchewan
21st-century Canadian poets
21st-century Canadian women writers